The Free Nation Coalition  is an Islamist electoral alliance in Egypt. Although the Authenticity Party and Flag Party initially joined the alliance, they later joined the Nation Alliance.

References

Political party alliances in Egypt
2013 establishments in Egypt